Pablo Cuevas and Horacio Zeballos were the defending champions, but they decided not to participate this year.

Flavio Cipolla and Potito Starace won the tournament, defeating Facundo Bagnis and Sergio Galdós in the final.

Seeds

Draw

References
 Main Draw

XIII Venice Challenge Save Cup - Doubles
2015 Doubles